Megan Therese Webb (born 6 October 1974) is an Australian politician and community sector worker. At the periodic elections in May 2019, she was elected to the Tasmanian Legislative Council as the independent member for Nelson, replacing long-time MLC Jim Wilkinson, who retired after nearly 24 years on the Council.

Prior to her election, Webb worked for Anglicare as manager of its Social Action and Research Centre. At the 2018 Tasmanian state election, she was part of a coalition which ran a campaign to remove poker machines in pubs and clubs by 2023.

References

External links
Official Website

1974 births
Living people
Members of the Tasmanian Legislative Council
Independent members of the Parliament of Tasmania
Women members of the Tasmanian Legislative Council
21st-century Australian politicians
21st-century Australian women politicians